Vice Admiral Henry George DeWolf  (26 June 1903 – 18 December 2000) was a Canadian naval officer who was famous as the first commander of  during the Second World War.

Early years

DeWolf entered the Royal Canadian Navy (RCN) in 1918 at age 15 when he attended the Royal Naval College of Canada (RNCC) at Esquimalt, British Columbia.

DeWolf graduated from RNCC in 1921 and was sent on an exchange with the Royal Navy to serve on board the battleship . He was promoted to sub-lieutenant in 1924 and took a six-month course in gunnery, torpedoes and navigation at the Royal Naval College, Greenwich. Returning to Canada in the summer of 1925, he was posted to one of the RCN's two destroyers, .

In May 1931, he married Gwendolen Gilbert of Somerset, Bermuda, whom he had met while serving aboard HMCS Patriot, which had spent a winter training there several years earlier. In 1932, DeWolf was posted to the destroyer  and then in 1933 to the destroyer .

In July 1935, he was promoted to lieutenant commander and posted to National Defence Headquarters (NDHQ) in Ottawa. He was made Assistant Director of Intelligence and Plans.

Second World War

HMCS St. Laurent

DeWolf returned to Canada in 1939 and was appointed commanding officer of the destroyer . St. Laurent was posted to convoy duty out of Halifax. St. Laurent under DeWolf reportedly fired the RCN's first shots of the war as they helped rescue British and French troops escaping from continental Europe during Operation Dynamo after the Fall of France in late May and early June 1940. DeWolf was promoted to commander in 1940. He and his ship were mentioned in despatches twice during his service on St. Laurent.

Years later, he recalled the following incident, which took place while in command of St. Laurent:

HMCS Haida

DeWolf took command of HMCS Haida in August 1943. Under DeWolf, Haida earned a reputation as "the Fightingest Ship in the Canadian Navy", and was responsible for sinking 14 enemy ships in just over a year, earning numerous accolades. Haida and DeWolf saw service with convoys to Murmansk as well as operations to secure the English Channel in preparation for Operation Overlord. Most of his more famous battles took place at night in the English Channel, when DeWolf secured his reputation as a fearless and skilful tactician and became known to his crew as "Hard-Over-Harry" for bold manoeuvres off the coast of France. DeWolf earned the Distinguished Service Order for rescuing survivors of  within range of enemy coastal guns on the French coast.

DeWolf left Haida and was recalled to Ottawa, where he was promoted to captain in September 1944, becoming Assistant Chief of Naval Staff.

Cold War

He served as Flag Officer Pacific Coast at Esquimalt from 1948 to 1950, then was recalled to NDHQ where he served as Vice Chief of Naval Staff from 1950 to 1952, then was posted to Washington, D.C. as principal military advisor to the Canadian ambassador from 1952 to 1956.

DeWolf was promoted to vice admiral in January 1956 and served as Chief of the Naval Staff before retiring from the RCN on 31 July 1960.

Retirement

DeWolf and his wife retired to her home in Bermuda, although they spent their summers in Ottawa, his last RCN posting. DeWolf was an active golfer and fisherman and he was active in the Royal Canadian Navy Benevolent Fund, which raises money for retired sailors down on their luck.

On 23 September 1992, the Town of Bedford named a  waterfront park on the Bedford Basin after DeWolf. The minutes of 28 November 2000 meeting of the Halifax Regional Council reveal that DeWolf had contributed $100,000 to the municipality, presumably as thanks for naming the prominent Admiral Harry DeWolf Park after him.

Awards and decorations
DeWolf's personal awards and decorations include the following:

125px

132px

127px

122px

References

External links 

 Canada's 25 Most Renowned Military Leaders

1903 births
2000 deaths
Burials at sea
Canadian admirals
Canadian military personnel from Nova Scotia
Royal Canadian Navy personnel of World War II
Canadian Commanders of the Order of the British Empire
Canadian Companions of the Distinguished Service Order
Foreign recipients of the Legion of Merit
Recipients of the Legion of Honour
People from Bedford, Nova Scotia
Canadian recipients of the Distinguished Service Cross (United Kingdom)
Royal Canadian Navy officers
Graduates of the Royal Naval College, Greenwich
Commanders of the Royal Canadian Navy
DeWolf family